Hydrops-ectopic calcification-moth-eaten skeletal dysplasia is a defect in cholesterol biosynthesis.  Greenberg characterized the condition in 1988.

It has been associated with the lamin B receptor.

Signs and Symptoms

Hydrops-ectopic calcification-moth-eaten skeletal dysplasia causes the bones in a fetus to develop abnormally. This leads to a characteristic "moth eaten" appearance of the bones when viewed under an X-ray. Micromelia, polydactyly and ectopic calcification, or the built up of calcium in the soft tissues of the body, may all occur. Eighty to ninety nine percent of effected individuals will have abnormally ossified vertebrae, abnormal pelvis bone ossification, anterior rib punctate calcifications and brachydactyly.

The second defining feature of hydrops-ectopic calcification-moth-eaten skeletal dysplasia is hydrops fetalis. A condition wherein an abnormal buildup of fluids occurs in the tissues of a fetus.

See also
 Ectopic calcification
 Hydrops

References

External links 

Cholesterol and steroid metabolism disorders